Lactarius maculatipes is a member of the large milk-cap genus Lactarius in the order Russulales. The species was described as new to science by mycologist Gertrude S. Burlingham in 1942.

See also
List of Lactarius species

References

External links

maculatipes
Fungi described in 1942
Fungi of North America